St. Mark United Primitive Baptist Church is a historic Primitive Baptist church on Maury Hill Street in Spring Hill, Tennessee, United States.  It was built in 1900 and added to the National Register of Historic Places in 2000.

References

Baptist churches in Tennessee
Churches in Maury County, Tennessee
Churches on the National Register of Historic Places in Tennessee
National Register of Historic Places in Maury County, Tennessee
Primitive Baptists